Malati Ghoshal (née Bose) (17 December 1902 – 17 July 1984) was an Indian Rabindra Sangeet singer and one of Rabindranath Tagore's 'Panchakanya' exponents.

Career
Malati Ghoshal was born in Kolkata to Hemendra Mohan Bose, a leading Swadeshi entrepreneur in Bengal, and Mrinalini Bose. Mrinalini was sister of writer Upendrakishore Raychowdhury, who was father of poet Sukumar Ray and grandfather of film director Satyajit Ray. She learnt Tappa from Manada Sundari Dasi, Kirtan from Purnakumari Dasi, Indian Classical Music from Gopeshwar Bandyopadhyay, Surendranath Bandyopadhyay and Shyam Sundar Mitra. She also played Sitar well.

She became a well known exponent of Rabindrasangeet, having sung directly for Rabindranath Tagore along with her contemporaries Amiya and Amita Tagore.

She was married to Dr. Sushanta Chandra Ghoshal in 1935. Dr Ghoshal was a noted microbiologist and Head of the School of Tropical Medicine in Calcutta, and had worked on the deadly diseases kala azar and cholera with the likes of Dr UN Bramhachari. He was also a proficient singer who supported and encouraged her singing talent.

She comes from an eminent family of Brahmo Samaj and performed at Brahmo ceremonies. She used to sing duets with her husband also.

Her first gramophone record, containing two Tagore Songs, "Ke Bosile Aji" and "Hridayo Basona Purno Holo", was released in 1940. Her second gramophone record, containing two other Tagore Songs, "E Parabase Rabe Ke" and "Jodi E Amaro Hridayo Duaro", was released in 1950. These four songs made her very popular in those days. During the Tagore centenary celebrations of 1961, she released her third disc (both songs duets with Ramesh Bandyopadhyay) with the songs "Anondodhwoni Jagao Gogone" and "Sokolkolushotamosohor".

After her husband passed away in 1952 she gave up singing. She is survived by a daughter, Aloka Mitra, herself well known in the sphere of social work in Bengal. and grandchildren who are NRIs.

References

External links
 
 Malati Ghosal at last.fm
 
 Swarnalatha at www.lakshmansruthi.com

1902 births
Bengali singers
Performers of Hindu music
Singers from Kolkata
1984 deaths
Rabindra Sangeet exponents
20th-century Indian singers
20th-century Indian women singers
Women musicians from West Bengal
20th-century women composers
19th-century women composers